Sree Narayana Trust, also known as the SN Trust, is an Indian educational organisation. The headquarters of Sree Narayana Trust is in Kollam city. It is named after Sree Narayana Guru and was formed by a former Chief Minister of Kerala, R. Sankar, in 1952 to manage the Sree Narayana College, Kollam. Later, educational institutions were started in other parts of Kerala. 

Today, the Trust runs numerous educational institutions and hospitals.

List of colleges

SN Trust founded schools and colleges in the independent India. There are fourteen colleges and more than 50 educational institutions are working under SN Trust.

See also
 Sivagiri, Kerala
 Bharath Dharma Jana Sena
 Socialist Republican Party

References

Further reading

External links
 

Narayana Guru
Ezhava
Education in Kollam
Organisations based in Kollam
Educational organisations in Kerala
1952 establishments in India
Educational institutions established in 1952